Ustye Kharyuzovo is a rural locality (a settlement) in Yenangskoye Rural Settlement, Kichmengsko-Gorodetsky District, Vologda Oblast, Russia. The population was 181 as of 2002.

Geography 
Ustye Kharyuzovo is located 85 km southeast of Kichmengsky Gorodok (the district's administrative centre) by road. Panovo is the nearest rural locality.

References 

Rural localities in Kichmengsko-Gorodetsky District